is an Echizen Railway Katsuyama Eiheiji Line railway station located in the city of Fukui, Fukui Prefecture, Japan.

Lines

Station layout
The station consists of one island platform connected to the station building by a level crossing. The station is staffed.

Adjacent stations

History
The station was opened on April 17, 1916. Operations were halted from June 25, 2001. The station reopened on July 20, 2003 as an Echizen Railway station.

Surrounding area
The station is surrounded by apartment buildings, houses, and shops.
Other points of interest include:
  - Fukui Bypass
 
Fukui Prefectural Fukui Nōrin Senior High School
Fukui Circulatory Hospital
Fukui Aiiku Hospital

See also
 List of railway stations in Japan

External links

  

Railway stations in Fukui Prefecture
Railway stations in Japan opened in 1916
Katsuyama Eiheiji Line
Fukui (city)